Bernardo de Izaguirre de los Reyes (died November 16, 1668) was a Roman Catholic prelate who served as Archbishop of La Plata o Charcas (1669–1670), Bishop of Cuzco (1662–1669), and Bishop of Panamá (1654–1659).

Biography
Bernardo de Izaguirre de los Reyes was born in Toledo, Spain.
He was selected on July 28, 1654, and confirmed on April 21, 1655, by Pope Alexander VII as Bishop of Panamá.
On January 12, 1659, he was consecrated bishop by Alonso de Briceño, Bishop of Caracas 
On July 31, 1662, he was appointed as Bishop of Cuzco. 
On July 15, 1669, Pope Clement IX confirmed him as Archbishop of La Plata o Charcas. 
He served as Archbishop of La Plata o Charcas until his death on November 16, 1668.

While bishop, he was the principal consecrator of Gabriel de Guilléstegui, Bishop of Paraguay.

References

External links and additional sources
 (for Chronology of Bishops) 
 (for Chronology of Bishops) 
 (for Chronology of Bishops) 
 (for Chronology of Bishops) 
 (for Chronology of Bishops) 
 (for Chronology of Bishops) 

1668 deaths
Bishops appointed by Pope Clement IX
Bishops appointed by Pope Alexander VII
17th-century Roman Catholic bishops in Panama
People from Toledo, Spain
17th-century Roman Catholic bishops in Peru
17th-century Roman Catholic bishops in Bolivia
Roman Catholic bishops of Panamá
Roman Catholic bishops of Cusco
Roman Catholic archbishops of Sucre